Borkhar-e Gharbi Rural District is a rural district (dehestan) in the Central District of Shahin Shahr and Meymeh County, Isfahan Province, Iran. At the 2006 census, its population was 11,525, in 2,910 families.  The rural district has 10 villages.

References 

Rural Districts of Isfahan Province
Shahin Shahr and Meymeh County